Ugol is a rural locality (a village) in Nesterovskoye Rural Settlement, Sokolsky District, Vologda Oblast, Russia. The population was 10 as of 2002.

Geography 
Ugol is located 36 km north of Sokol (the district's administrative centre) by road. Bakulino is the nearest rural locality.

References 

Rural localities in Sokolsky District, Vologda Oblast